Ascq Communal Cemetery is a cemetery located in the former village of Ascq, today a district of Villeneuve d'Ascq, Nord, France.

Organisation 

The cemetery shelters primarily graves of civilians, but has two particularities : it shelters British and Commonwealth war graves, as well as the bodies of the victims of Ascq massacre in 1944.

Commonwealth war graves 

The cemetery hosts Commonwealth war graves of the First World War and the Second World War.

History 
At the end of 1918 and in 1919, some British units were posted in Ascq for a few months :
 the 229th Field Ambulance,
 the 13th and 63rd Casualty Clearing Stations,
 the 39th Stationary Hospita.

Casualties 

On the cemetery are 55 victims of the First World War (died between November, 7th 1914 and September, 5th 1919) and 3 victims of the Second World War (died on May, 24th and 25th 1940).

The 4 Chinese victims were workers from the Chinese Labour Corps.

See also 
 Commonwealth War Graves Commission
 Chinese Labour Corps

External links
 The cemetery on ww1cemeteries.com
 The cemetery on peterswar.net 
 Commonwealth War Graves Commission

Commonwealth War Graves Commission cemeteries in France
Cemeteries in Nord (French department)
Buildings and structures in Villeneuve-d'Ascq